Montaigu-le-Blin is a commune in the Allier department in central France. It was first mentioned in the 10th century as Mons Acutus.

Population

See also
Communes of the Allier department

References

Communes of Allier
Allier communes articles needing translation from French Wikipedia